Brian Henton (born 19 September 1946) is a former racing driver from England. He won both 1974 British Formula Three Championships and the 1980 European Formula Two Championship. He participated in 38 Formula One Grands Prix, debuting on 19 July 1975, but never scored any championship points.

Henton (nicknamed "Superhen" in the British racing press) came from a modest council house background and did not start racing until he was 23. On winning the minor British Formula Vee championship in 1971, ever-conscious of the value of public relations, he announced that he was going to be World Champion. This aim eluded him, but he enjoyed a successful career in Formula Three and Formula Two.

Henton's F1 debut came in 1975 for Lotus, theoretically a good drive but the team was in turmoil with the Lotus 72 finally uncompetitive and its replacement the Lotus 76 a failure, so nothing concrete was achieved. Between 1975 and 1978 he mixed Formula One and Formula Two drives (including a spell in a private March for his own British Formula One Racing Team), never quite establishing himself in either category, but clinched the 1980 F2 championship for Toleman, who took him into F1 for 1981. The first Toleman-Hart was something of a disaster, overweight and underdeveloped, and Henton only managed to qualify once. Unfruitful outings for Arrows and Tyrrell in 1982 led to no more success, though he did set the fastest lap at the British Grand Prix - Henton is the only driver in Formula One history to have set a fastest lap without ever scoring a championship point.

Perhaps fittingly, his last Formula One outing was at the Race of Champions at Brands Hatch in April 1983, which also turned out to be the last non-championship F1 race in the modern era.

Following his retirement from the sport, he returned to running a car dealership and later moved into property development and in recent years has diversified into other areas, notably engineering. He has occasionally driven at historic events and holds equestrian events at his home in Ingarsby Hall, Leicestershire.

Racing record

Career summary

Complete European Formula Two Championship results
(key) (Races in bold indicate pole position; races in italics indicate fastest lap)

Complete Formula One World Championship results
(key)

 Henton drove Rupert Keegan's No. 18 Surtees during practice for the 1978 Austrian Grand Prix but was not officially entered for the race.

References

External links
Formula One World

English racing drivers
English Formula One drivers
European Formula Two Championship drivers
British Formula Three Championship drivers
People from Castle Donington
Sportspeople from Leicestershire
1946 births
Living people
Team Lotus Formula One drivers
March Formula One drivers
Boro Formula One drivers
British Formula One Racing Team Formula One drivers
Toleman Formula One drivers
Arrows Formula One drivers
Tyrrell Formula One drivers
Formula One team owners
Formula One team principals